The Christiania Islands are a group of islands and rocks between Liège Island and Trinity Island, in the Palmer Archipelago. They were charted by the Belgian Antarctic Expedition, 1897–99, under Gerlache, who named the group for Christiania (now Oslo), Norway, where he obtained assistance and equipment for the expedition.

See also 
 List of Antarctic and sub-Antarctic islands

Further reading 
 Thomas Wyatt. Bagshawe, Two men in the Antarctic : an expedition to Graham land, 1920-1922, P 186
  United States. Hydrographic Office, Sailing Directions for Antarctica, P 144

References

External links 

 Christiania Islands on USGS website
 Christiania Islands on SCAR website
 Christiania Islands area satellite map
 Christiania Islands Copernix satellite image

Islands of the Palmer Archipelago